Thandalam is a village in the Kumbakonam taluk of Thanjavur district, Tamil Nadu, India. It is in the Kumbakonam-Mannargudi arterial road.

Demographics 

As per the 2001 census, Thandalam had a total population of 1444 with 736 males and 708 females. The sex ratio was 962. The literacy rate was 83.03.

Notable People

The current head of the Kanchi Kamakoti Peetam, Sankaracharya Sri Vijayendra Saraswathi was born in this village.

References 

Villages in Thanjavur district